The 2021 Abilene Christian Wildcats baseball team represented Abilene Christian University during the 2021 NCAA Division I baseball season. The Wildcats played their home games at Crutcher Scott Field and were led by third–year head coach Rick McCarty. They were members of the Southland Conference. This was Abilene Christian's final year in the Southland as they will be moving to the Western Athletic Conference for the 2022 season.

Preseason

Southland Conference Coaches Poll
The Southland Conference Coaches Poll was released on February 11, 2021 and the Wildcats were picked to finish tenth in the conference with 98 votes.

Roster

Schedule and results

{| class="toccolours" width=95% style="clear:both; margin:1.5em auto; text-align:center;"
|-
! colspan=2 style="" | 2021 Abilene Christian Wildcats Baseball Game Log
|-
! colspan=2 style="" | Regular Season (34-19)
|- valign="top"
|
{| class="wikitable collapsible" style="margin:auto; width:100%; text-align:center; font-size:95%"
! colspan=12 style="padding-left:4em;" | February (5-2)
|-
! Date
! Opponent
! Rank
! Site/Stadium
! Score
! Win
! Loss
! Save
! TV
! Attendance
! Overall Record
! SLC Record
|- align="center" bgcolor=#ddffdd
|Feb. 20 ||  || || Crutcher Scott Field • Abilene, TX || W 16-3 (7 inns) || Chirpich (1-0) || Pinedo (0-1) || None || || 367 || 1-0 ||
|- align="center" bgcolor=#ddffdd
|Feb. 20 || Tarleton State || || Crutcher Scott Field • Abilene, TX || W 7-2 || Cervantes (1-0) || Gagnon (0-1) || None || || 367 || 2-0 ||
|- align="center" bgcolor=#ffdddd
|Feb. 21 || at Tarleton State || || Cecil Ballow Baseball Complex • Stephenville, TX || L 4-10 || Poe (1-0) || Stephenson (0-1) || None || || 322 || 2-1 ||
|- align="center" bgcolor=#ddffdd
|Feb. 23 || at  || || Olsen Field at Blue Bell Park • College Station, TX || W 6-5 || Riley (1-0) || Menefee (0-1) || None || SECN+ || 1,287 || 3-1 ||
|- align="center" bgcolor=#ddffdd
|Feb. 26 ||  || || Crutcher Scott Field • Abilene, TX || W 8-7 || Riley (2-0) || Laukkanen (0-1) || None || || 239 || 4-1 ||
|- align="center" bgcolor=#ddffdd
|Feb. 27 || New Mexico State || || Crutcher Scott Field • Abilene, TX || W 15-9 || Huffing (1-0) || Rodriguez (0-1) || None || || 301 || 5-1 ||
|- align="center" bgcolor=#ffdddd
|Feb. 28 || New Mexico State || || Crutcher Scott Field • Abilene, TX || L 2-12 (7 inns) || Jefferson (1-0) || Stephenson (0-2) || None || || 215 || 5-2 ||       
|}
|-
|

|-
|

|-
|

|-
! colspan=2 style="" | Post-Season (2–2)
|-
|Schedule Source:*Rankings are based on the team's current ranking in the D1Baseball poll.
|}

Posteason
Conference Accolades 
Player of the Year: Colton Cowser – SHSU
Hitter of the Year: Colton Eager – ACUPitcher of the Year: Will Dion – MCNS
Relief Pitcher of the Year: Tyler Cleveland – UCA
Freshman of the Year: Brennan Stuprich – SELA
Newcomer of the Year: Grayson Tatrow – ACUClay Gould Coach of the Year: Rick McCarty – ACUAll Conference First TeamChase Kemp (LAMR)
Nate Fisbeck (MCNS)
Itchy Burts (TAMUCC)Bash Randle (ACU)Mitchell Dickson (ACU)
Lee Thomas (UIW)
Colton Cowser (SHSU)Colton Eager (ACU)Clayton Rasbeary (MCNS)
Will Dion (MCNS)
Brennan Stuprich (SELA)
Will Warren (SELA)
Tyler Cleveland (UCA)
Anthony Quirion (LAMR)All Conference Second TeamPreston Faulkner (SELA)
Daunte Stuart (NSU)
Kasten Furr (UNO)
Evan Keller (SELA)
Skylar Black (SFA)
Tre Obregon III (MCNS)
Jack Rogers (SHSU)
Pearce Howard (UNO)Grayson Tatrow (ACU)Chris Turpin (UNO)
John Gaddis (TAMUCC)
Trevin Michael (LAMR)
Caleb Seroski (UNO)
Jacob Burke (SELA)All Conference Third TeamLuke Marbach (TAMUCC)
Salo Iza (UNO)
Austin Cain (NICH)
Darren Willis (UNO)
Ryan Snell (LAMR)Tommy Cruz (ACU)Tyler Finke (SELA)
Payton Harden (MCNS)
Mike Williams (TAMUCC)
Cal Carver (NSU)
Levi David (NSU)
Dominic Robinson (SHSU)
Jack Dallas (LAMR)Brett Hammit (ACU)All Conference Defensive TeamLuke Marbach (TAMUCC)
Nate Fisebeck (MCNS)
Anthony Quirion (LAMR)
Darren Willis (UNO)
Gaby Cruz (SELA)
Julian Gonzales (MCNS)
Colton Cowser (SHSU)
Avery George (LAMR)
Will Dion (MCNS)References:'''

References

Abilene Christian
Abilene Christian Wildcats baseball seasons
Abilene Christian Wildcats baseball